Asylum Years is the second "best of" compilation covering Tom Waits' Asylum Records years. The album retreads more than half of the track-listing of Anthology of Tom Waits.

While never officially released in the US during its initial run, the compilation is readily available on the iTunes Store since Anti- Records acquired the rights to Waits's Asylum catalog in 2017.

Track listing (CD version)
Songs written by Tom Waits, except where noted.

 "Diamonds on My Windshield" - 3:08
 "(Looking For) The Heart of Saturday Night" - 3:55
 "Martha" - 4:29
 "The Ghosts of Saturday Night (After Hours at Napoleone's Pizza House)" - 3:14
 "Grapefruit Moon" - 4:49
 "Small Change" - 5:05
 "Burma Shave" - 6:33
 "I Never Talk to Strangers" - 3:41
 "Tom Traubert's Blues" - 6:34
 "Blue Valentines" - 5:54
 "Potter's Field" (Bob Alcivar, Waits) - 8:44
 "Kentucky Avenue" - 4:51
 "Somewhere (From West Side Story)" (Leonard Bernstein, Stephen Sondheim) - 3:53
 "Ruby's Arms" - 5:35

Asylum Years
Asylum Years
Asylum Records compilation albums